The Federal Prison Camp, Yankton (FPC Yankton) is a minimum-security United States federal prison for male inmates in Yankton, South Dakota. It is operated by the Federal Bureau of Prisons, a division of the United States Department of Justice. The prison is situated on the former campus of Yankton College, which operated until 1984. The site was converted to a prison in 1988.

FPC Yankton is located 60 miles northwest of Sioux City, Iowa, and 85 miles southwest of Sioux Falls, South Dakota.

In popular culture
Forbes magazine rated FPC Yankton one of "Americas 10 Cushiest Prisons" in 2009. In describing the facility, Asher Hawkins wrote, "The winters are tough, and the nearest city of any size is at least an hour away, but Yankton is a standalone minimum-security facility with a staff that's not too tough on prisoners. White-collar cons can take classes in accounting, business administration and business management."

In Twin Peaks, Special Agent Dale Cooper's doppelgänger is held at FPC Yankton.

Notable inmates

Former

See also
 List of U.S. federal prisons
 Federal Bureau of Prisons
 Incarceration in the United States

References

Buildings and structures in Yankton, South Dakota
Yankton
Yankton
1988 establishments in South Dakota